These are The Official Charts Company UK Official Indie Chart number one hits of 1992.

See also
1992 in music

References

United Kingdom Indie Singles
Indie 1992
UK Indie Chart number-one singles